Mustafa Kurtuldum (born May 10, 2001) is a Turkish professional basketball player for Tofaş of the Basketbol Süper Ligi (BSL), who plays as a shooting guard.

References

External links
Mustafa Kurtuldum Euroleague.net Profile
Mustafa Kurtuldum TBLStat.net Profile
Mustafa Kurtuldum Eurobasket Profile
Mustafa Kurtuldum TBL Profile

Living people
2001 births
21st-century Turkish people
Anadolu Efes S.K. players
Basketball players from Istanbul
Büyükçekmece Basketbol players
Merkezefendi Belediyesi Denizli Basket players
Shooting guards
Turkish men's basketball players